Monroe Correctional Complex is a Washington State Department of Corrections men's prison located in Monroe, Washington, United States. With an operating capacity of 2,500, it is the second largest prison in the state. It opened in 1910, 21 years after statehood.

Facility 
Vocational classes offered at MCC include printing, information technology and personal computer support specialist, and inmates can earn a GED while incarcerated. An independent non-profit, University Beyond Bars (UBB), offers college courses as a volunteer organization, and some people incarcerated at MCC have earned associate degrees despite the prohibition of state funding for post-secondary education.

A staff-supervised youth program is offered to high school and middle school students. It is designed to deter students from becoming involved in a criminal lifestyle by meeting selected inmates who tell them about the choices they made which led to their incarceration.

Class II and III jobs are located within MCC. Class III jobs provide essential services to the facility such as maintenance, janitorial, clerical warehouse workers, and kitchen work. Class II jobs are designed to reduce the cost of goods and services to state agencies and other tax-supported entities. These include laundry services, a print shop, a license tab shop, and the panel program. Class I industries were once housed at MCC, but were eliminated in July 2004 as a result of a Washington Supreme Court decision that held that inmates cannot be employed by private commercial enterprises.

Inmates have access to classification and mental health counselors at MCC, in addition to a wide range of paid and volunteer staff.

Units

Washington State Reformatory Unit (WSRU) - The original prison at the site; constructed in 1910. WSR is the second oldest prison in the state, only to Washington State Penitentiary. WSR has a capacity of approximately 720, and houses minimum, medium, and maximum custody inmates. There are also extended family visit trailers for family style visits with immediate relatives, available to the entire Monroe complex. WSR also has an inpatient hospital on the 4th floor that is classified as Maximum security even though the rest of the facility is medium, which classifies WSRU as a (Maximum Security) rating for DOC's transport rating System. The 4th floor hospital is also used by other correctional facilities within the state. Major medical care can often be performed here along with daily dialysis, X-ray, and minor medical procedures, but serious surgical procedures are performed in community hospitals.

Special Offender Unit (SOU) - Opened in 1980 as Special Offender Center (SOC) under Gov. Dixy Lee Ray, and later renamed to Special Offender Unit (currently SOU) under Gov. Jay Inslee, the Special Offender Unit houses Mentally Ill Offenders, and has a 400 bed capacity. Security Levels are Maximum, Close, Medium and Minimum. The SOU is unique in that it also employed Psychology Doctors to assess and treat mentally ill Offenders as part of its base operation unlike other facilities.

Twin Rivers Unit (TRU) - Originally known as Twin Rivers Corrections Center, the Twin Rivers Unit was opened in 1984. With a population capacity of 800, TRU houses both minimum and medium security levels. The Washington State Sex Offender Treatment and Assessment Program is located at TRU, and those participating in the program are housed there.

Minimum Security Unit (MSU) - Opened in 1997, the Minimum Security Unit has a capacity of 470. The MSU has a program housing Mentally Ill Offenders that allows them to transfer to minimum from other security levels. This program is the only one in the state. MSU houses Offenders with less than 4 years to serve.

Intensive Management Unit (IMU) - Opened in 2007, the IMU being Violator Unit and Intensive Management System (IMS) has a capacity of 200+, 100+ of that being designated for probation violators. The IMS houses Offenders that are difficult to manage or are a threat to others. IMS has extremely controlled movement where as the Violator unit is treated as Minimum to medium security where violators can move in their respective areas

History
The Washington State Reformatory opened in 1910, making it the second oldest operational prison in Washington state, behind the Washington State Penitentiary. The next facility opened was the Special Offender Unit in 1980. In 1984 the Twin Rivers Corrections Center was opened. It is now known as the Twin Rivers Unit. In 1997 the Minimum Security Unit was opened. In 2007 the Intensive management unit was opened.

On January 29, 2011, Officer Jayme Biendl was strangled to death with an amplifying cord by an inmate within prison walls. Inmate Byron Scherf was accused of the murder. Officer Biendl had repeatedly filed work orders for additional security measures to her supervisors which went unanswered. One of her supervisors, Sergeant Jimmy Fletcher, signed a sworn affidavit that he had signed one of the work orders and forwarded it up the chain of command. In reaction to his knowledge of work orders being submitted. The department began to retaliate against Sergeant Fletcher and several other staff for speaking out. Several complaints were filed against the leadership of Monroe for the retaliatory behavior. In 2013 the Public Employees Relations Commission found in favor of Sergeant Fletcher that the DOC retaliated and held him back from promotional opportunities. In 2018 while assigned as a Lieutenant he obtained information that substantiated that the department management were spreading false information stating his involvement in the aftermath of the murder of Officer Biendl. He attempted to resolve the matter without success, demoted himself back to the rank of Sgt. Shortly afterwards a lawsuit was filed and a settlement was reached out of court in favor of Sgt. Fletcher. He elected to resign after 20 years with the department because of declining health issues due to the retaliatory behavior of the department leadership. In reaction to the murder, Washington DOC Officers now carry pepper spray and a "panic button" in case of emergency. No other changes have been made for Offender activities. Inmate Byron Scherf was found guilty of the murder of Officer Biendl and sentenced to death. However when Governor Jay Inslee was elected into office he placed a moratorium in favor of on all inmates on death row.

During the 2020 coronavirus pandemic, the Monroe complex had eleven positive cases—five staff and six inmates in the same minimum security unit. Over 100 prisoners at the complex rioted on April 8 in response to the outbreak, but were broken up by corrections officers using crowd control tactics and an evacuation of housing units. The following day, Governor Inslee announced plans to release nonviolent offenders and at-risk inmates to lower the risk of infection.

Popular culture
 The prison scenes in The Butterfly Effect were filmed at the Washington State Reformatory.

Notable inmates

James Fogle, author of Drugstore Cowboy, the novel on which the film of the same name was based
Michael Tarbert, Spokane murderer known for killing 12-year-old Rebecca West and 11-year-old Nicki Wood in 1991. 
Glen Sebastian Burns, Canadian murderer known for killing Atif Rafay's family in 1994.
Atif Rafay, Canadian murderer known for killing his family with Glen Sebastian Burns in 1994.
Brian Bassett, McCleary murderer known for killing his parents and younger brother in 1995.
Terence "Terry" Weaver, Blaine murderer known for killing Kelli Scott in 1996.
Guy Rasmussen, Lakewood murderer known for killing 9-year-old Cindy Allinger in 1996.
David Anderson, Bellevue murderer known for the Bellevue murders in 1997.
David Dodge, Stanwood murderer known for killing 12-year-old Ashley Jones in 1997.
Isaac Zamora, perpetrator of the 2008 Skagit County shootings.

See also 
List of law enforcement agencies in Washington (state)
List of United States state correction agencies
List of U.S. state prisons
List of Washington state prisons

References

External links
 MCC page at Washington Department of Corrections website

Prisons in Washington (state)
Buildings and structures in Snohomish County, Washington
Monroe, Washington
1910 establishments in Washington (state)